The Coordinating Minister for Social Policies is an appointment in the Cabinet of Singapore, initially introduced on 1 October 2015 to cover both economic and social policies. However, the economic policy portfolio was dropped when the role was redesignated in 2019.

List of officeholders 
The Ministry is headed by the Prime Minister Office, who is appointed as part of the Cabinet of Singapore. The incumbent minister is Senior Minister Tharman Shanmugaratnam from the People's Action Party.

See also
Coordinating Minister for Economic Policies
Coordinating Minister for National Security
Minister-in-Charge of Muslim Affairs

References

2015 establishments in Singapore
Social Policies